Learnosity is an Irish-based education technology company. It produces a set of tools that businesses use to build online assessment and learning products. The company is headquartered in Dublin, Ireland and has offices in Sydney, Australia, New York, USA and Los Angeles, USA.

History 
Learnosity was founded in Dublin, Ireland in 2007 by CEO, Gavin Cooney and CTO, Mark Lynch. The company creates online education assessment and teaching software. Learnosity initially focussed primarily on audio assessment and mobile-assisted language learning, notably the FÓN project – a joint collaboration between The National Council for Curriculum and Assessment (NCCA) and the National Centre for Technology in Education (NCTE).

In 2011, Learnosity pivoted from a primarily B2C model to a B2B model. The company currently operates a Platform as a Service (PaaS) business model where its products, including a suite of embeddable technology-enhanced items.

In 2016,  the company formed the MathQuill Alliance together with Desmos and Sapient Docs to support the continued development of MathQuill, a cross-browser, JavaScript library that displays, and allows users to easily edit and create, mathematical notation in web browsers.

Funding 
In September 2015, Australian-based, company 3P Learning announced that it had acquired a 23.07% shareholding in Learnosity. In January 2016, 3P Learning acquired a further 16.93% interest in Learnosity for AUD$20.2million, taking its total shareholding in Learnosity to 40%.

In May 2018, 3P Learning sold its 40% stake in Learnosity to Boston-based company Battery Ventures.

In June 2021, Learnosity acquired the UK headquartered Questionmark.

Awards 
 2022 EdTech Breakthrough Award Winner - Remote Learning Solution Provider of the Year
 2022 SIIA CODiE Award Best Formative Assessment Solution (finalist)
 2021 EdTech Breakthrough Award Winner - Remote Learning Solution Provider of the Year
 2016 SIIA Codie awards Best K-12 Enterprise Solution
 2016 SIIA CODiE Award Best Authoring & Developer Tool
 2015 SIIA CODiE Award Best K-12 Enterprise Solution (finalist)
 2014 SIIA CODiE Award Best K-12 Enterprise Solution

References 

Educational technology companies
Software companies established in 2007
Companies based in Dublin (city)
Irish companies established in 2007